Shechen Monastery is one of the "Six Mother Monasteries" of the Nyingma tradition of Tibetan Buddhism.  It was originally located in Kham, Tibet, but was destroyed in the late 1950s during the Cultural Revolution and was rebuilt in Nepal in 1985.

History
The original Shechen Monastery was located southwest of Langduo Township in Kham on the route to Dzogchen Monastery in what is now Dêgê County, Garzê Prefecture, Sichuan, China. It was founded in 1695 by Shechen Rabjam Tenpé Gyaltsen, though it is sometimes claimed to have been built by Gyurme Kunzang Namgyal in 1734. It became extremely influential in the 18th and 19th centuries, with up to 160 satellite monasteries dotting the hillsides.  The monastery was destroyed in the 1950s as part of the Communist Chinese government's Cultural Revolution.

In the 1980s, Dilgo Khyentse Rinpoche transplanted the rich tradition of the original Shechen Monastery to a new home near the great Stupa of Boudhanath in Kathmandu, Nepal.

Shechen Monastery today
The monastery serves as the main seat of the Shechen tradition in exile. There are more than 300 monks at Shechen Monastery. The monastery teaches music, dance, painting and Buddhist philosophy. Its elementary school provides "a modern education for children between five and fourteen years of age."

The present abbot is the seventh Shechen Rabjam Rinpoche, the grandson of Dilgo Khyentse. Prominent members of the monastery include the Yangsi (Tib.ཡང་སྲིད reincarnation) of Dilgo Khyentse, Khandro Lhamo, Matthieu Ricard and Changling Rinpoche.

Footnotes

References
 Dudjom Rinpoche and Jikdrel Yeshe Dorje. The Nyingma School of Tibetan Buddhism: its Fundamentals and History. Two Volumes. 1991. Translated and edited by Gyurme Dorje with Matthew Kapstein. Wisdom Publications, Boston.

External links
 Shechen Monastery in Nepal - the main Shechen website
 Shechen Monastery in Tibet
 Shechen Rabjam Rinpoche's profile at Rigpa wiki

Buddhist temples in Tibet
Buddhist temples in Nepal
1695 establishments in Asia
Religious organizations established in 1695
Buddhist monasteries in Tibet
Tibetan Buddhist temples in the Garzê Tibetan Autonomous Prefecture
Nyingma monasteries and temples
1985 establishments in Nepal
Buddhist monasteries in Sichuan